Daniel-André Tande (born 24 January 1994) is a Norwegian ski jumper, 2018 ski flying World Champion and 2018 team Olympic champion.

Career
Tande's first World Cup start was in Bad Mitterndorf on 11 January 2014. On 25 November 2015, he achieved his first-ever World Cup win in Klingenthal. On 1 January 2017 he won his second World Cup event in Garmisch-Partenkirchen.

On 20 January 2018, Tande achieved the gold medal of the 2018 Ski Flying World Championships. In the three-part competition, he became the ski flying World Champion, beating Kamil Stoch and Richard Freitag. Next day, Tande became a double 2018 Ski Flying World Champion. In team competition Norway, including Tande and his teammates Robert Johansson, Johann Andre Forfang and Andreas Stjernen, defended title of Ski Flying World Champions. The same team is 2018 team Olympic champion.

In March 2021, Tande crashed during a training jump, suffering several injuries and remaining in a medically-induced coma for four days. He recovered and resumed jumping at the 2021 Ski Jumping World Cup.

World Cup

Standings

Wins

References

External links

 
 
 
 

1994 births
Living people
People from Kongsberg
Norwegian male ski jumpers
FIS Nordic World Ski Championships medalists in ski jumping
Olympic ski jumpers of Norway
Ski jumpers at the 2018 Winter Olympics
Ski jumpers at the 2022 Winter Olympics
Medalists at the 2018 Winter Olympics
Olympic gold medalists for Norway
Olympic medalists in ski jumping
People from Narvik
Sportspeople from Nordland